Philipp Dengel (15 December 1888 – 28 March 1948) was a German journalist and politician (SPD, KPD). He sat as a Communist member of the Reichstag (national parliament) between 1924 and 1930, and through most of the fractious 1920s was a close political ally of Ernst Thälmann who became party leader in 1925. There was a falling out between the two men over the so-called Wittorf affair of 1928, however. Between 1931 and 1947, Dengel lived principally in Moscow in connection with his party work (and because between 1933 and 1945 it would have been highly dangerous for Dengel, as a known Communist activist-politician, to set foot in Germany).

Life

Provenance and early years 
Philipp Dengel was born in Ober-Ingelheim, a wine village formally just outside the Mittelrhein region, and a short distance to the west of Mainz. Philipp Dengel, his father, was in business as a wine producer and distiller.   He attended school, initially, in the village and then, between 1903 and 1907, the "Realgymnasium" (secondary school) in Mainz.   For the next four years, till 1911, he studied Philosophy and History at the universities of Mainz and Giessen   Between 1911 and 1913 he worked as a teacher at a private school in Heidelberg and was then, in 1913, called up for Military service. He was still in the Imperial Army when war broke out the next year, and remained so till 1918, ending the war discharged as a "Leutnant" ("junior officer") in the military reserve.

Revolutionary credentials forged by war 
He had joined the Social Democratic Party in 1911, but like hundreds of thousands of others he was radicalised by the evils of war, and during March 1919 would switch to the recently formed Communist Party.   When revolution broke out in November 1918 he participated actively, joining Kurt Eisner in Bavaria, and turning up in Berlin shortly afterwards as legation secretary from the short-lived Bavarian Soviet (revolutionary government).  He teamed up with Alfons Goldschmidt to help launch the Räte-Zeitung, a four-page newspaper of the revolutionary "Workers' council" movement.   He was a contributing editor to "Die Republik", a daily newspaper directed by the polymath anti-militarist Wilhelm Herzog.   In Berlin during the first part of 1920 Dengel participated in defeating the Kapp Putsch and briefly became a member of the extremist breakaway Communist Workers' Party.   Between September and December 1920 he visited Moscow.   According to at least one source it was only after a visit to Moscow and a meeting with Lenin himself that during the first part of 1921 he returned to the mainstream Communist Party.

In May 1921, Philipp Dengel joined Die Rote Fahne newspaper, which by this time had become a Communist Party publication, as foreign policy editor. The next year, he was switched to work as a senior journalist with newspapers backing the party in Germany's principal industrial regions further to the west.   In 1922, he took over as editor in chief at Sozialistische Republik, the Communist daily newspaper produced in Cologne. By 1923, he had moved again, and was looking after the Hamburger Volkszeitung.   He took part in the October uprising in the city, taking on key organisational responsibilities for munitions and food supplies.

At the start of 1924, Philipp Dengel took a party appointment as "Polleiter" (loosely "policy leader") with the regional party leadership team ("Bezirksleitung") for the "Wasserkante" region surrounding Hamburg. Later that year, he moved to the Lower Rhine region, appointed regional "Polleiter" there in August 1924, by now using for party purposes the party-pseudonym "Schmidt".

Party ructions 
In May 1924, Philipp Dengel was elected as one of 62 successful Communist Party candidates to membership of the Reichstag (national parliament).  It was the first time the Communists, now with more than 10% of the national vote, achieved a significant presence in the assembly.   At the Communist Party's tenth party congress, held in Berlin during the third week in July 1925, Dengel was elected to the Party Central Committee, remaining a member through a decade of mixed political fortunes till 1935.    1925 was a year of intensified factionalism within the Communist Party. The German executive commission of the Moscow-based Comintern, presumably taking their lead from Stalin, became disenchanted with the leadership of Arkadi Maslow and Ruth Fischer after the second general election of 1924, held in December, which saw the party's vote share drop back below 10%. Some commentators saw this development as a result of an improvement in the German economy, but for Stalin and the Communist left wingers it was a sign that their party was becoming insufficiently differentiated from the political mainstream.   As the party became more divided, an "open letter" was drawn up between 12 and 14 August and sent to the German party by the Comintern's German executive commission, drawing attention to the growing resurgence of imperialist nostalgia on the extreme right of German politics, and providing a careful Soviet-Marxist analysis and prescription. Capitalist stabilization imperilled the class struggle on which future political success for Soviet style communism in Germany depended.   (The "open letter" was later published in Die Rote Fahne on 22 December 1928.)   A triumvirate comprising Ernst Thälmann, Philipp Dengel and John Schehr led support for the "open letter" during the run-up a Central Committee meeting which took place between 28 August and 1 September 1925. Arkadi Maslow and Ruth Fischer retained their politburo memberships for the next few weeks, but under Thälmann's leadership the existing politburo itself was sidelined by the alternative team, which proved adept at capturing the support of other influential comrades.   In October 1925, Ernst Thälmann emerged as party leader. Philipp Dengel, his close political ally, became a Politburo member and served, between 1925 and 1929, as secretary to the Party Central Committee and co-chairmen (with Thälmann) of the party, based in Berlin.

During the late summer of 1928, at the sixth Comintern World Congress which took place in Moscow, Dengel was elected a member of the organisation's executive committee  and of its praesidium.    The congress also saw powerful endorsement by Thälmann of Stalin's uncompromising and fateful rejection of any kind of collaboration with the German Social Democratic Party. Dengel would remain a member of the Comintern praesidium, at least formally, till June 1941.

In October 1928, the Wittorf affair seriously undermined the powerful alliance at the top of the party between Thälmann and Dengel. The Wittorf affair was a major embezzlement scandal.   John Wittorf, like Ernst Thälmann came from Hamburg. The two men were party comrades and close friends of longstanding. Thälmann attempted to cover up the whole matter and was expelled from the Central Committee by horrified comrades. It fell to Dengel to suggest that Thälmann should give up the party leadership "for a period".   This led to an immediate distancing between Thälmann and Dengel. It did not lead to Thälmann surrendering the party leadership, however, and Dengel found that in falling out with Ernst Thälmann he had also fallen out with Stalin and those German party comrades who danced to the Soviet leader's tune. After Thälmann had been restored to his membership of the Central Committee, Dengel received a reprimand and faced the loss of his position as secretary to the Party Central Committee.

Diminution of party position 
The party's twelfth party congress was held at Berlin-Wedding during the second week in June 1929.  Dengel was re-elected to the Party Central Committee, but he was no longer included in the party's inner caucus, the Politburo;  and he was stripped of other party functions.    Back in his Ingelheim home base, reports surfaced that he had been expelled from the national party leadership due to conflicts with Thälmann:  these were vehemently denied by local party officials, who were able to cite his continued membership of the Central Committee in support of their denials.   With more time for journalism, he served during 1930/31 as editor at Die Rote Fahne, the party newspaper. in succession to Heinrich Süßkind whose fall from grace, in the eyes of Stalin and Thälmann, was evidently more absolute than Dengel's.   There are also references to Dengel having taught during this period at the "Rosa Luxemburg party academy" in Berlin-Ficthenau on the eastern edge of the city.

For the 1930 general election, which took place in September, Philipp Dengel was no longer included on the party's candidate list. His career as a member of parliament was at an end.   He nevertheless campaigned actively for the party in the 1930 election, passionately following the Stalinist party line in encounters with those urging unity between the two principal parties of the political left in order to block Hitlerite populism. On 10 September 1930, he appeared at an election meeting in Ingelheim and addressed more than 300 listeners:  they "listened attentively to his remarks", even if they did not all agree with everything he said. In his speech he savagely attacked the Social Democrats, which he characterised as the complete opposite of a "true workers' party".

Comintern 
Towards the end of 1931, the party sent Dengel to Moscow to work for the Comintern.   His work appears to have involved a good deal of international travel, and at this stage his wife and family seem to have remained in Germany.   According to at least one source, he spent almost a year in Spain during 1931/32 followed by several weeks in Latin America.   By the end of 1932, he was back in Moscow, where between December 1933 and August 1935 he headed up the Comintern regional secretariat for Scandinavia. This involved a number of trips to Denmark, Norway and Sweden.

Back in Germany, the National Socialists took power in January 1933 and quickly transformed the country into a one-party dictatorship. The Reichstag fire took place in Berlin overnight on 27/28 February 1933, and was blamed by the government with implausible haste on "Communists". It quickly became apparent – to the extent that it had not already been – that those with communist connections were in particular danger from the security services. Denger's wife Katharina now joined him in Moscow where the family were from now on to be based, though Dengel would continue to travel extensively in connection with his Comintern work.

In July/August, Dengel attended the Seventh World Congress of the Comintern, identifying himself by the party cover-name "Ulmer".  A couple of months later the exiled Communist Party held its thirteenth party congress in October 1935. In order to try and reduce the dangers to the comrades involved, this congress was always referred to in communications as the party's Brussels congress. It took place in the town of Kuntsevo, just outside Moscow (into which the entire Kuntsevo District has subsequently been subsumed). Dengel was in attendance.  He left both the Comintern congress and the "Brussels" congress armed with clear detailed instructions from the party to its members and activists concerning the project, for which he had personally already been pressing, involving the creation of a broadly based anti-Hitler German "popular front" movement.  A new Party Central Committee was elected, comprising just fifteen comrades. The Party Central Committee elected at the previous party congress, in 1929, had consisted of 38 comrades. With the benefit of hindsight, it becomes clear that the new slimmed down Communist Party Central Committee was made up of Ulbricht supporters. Philipp Dengel, despite being based in Moscow at the time, and despite having already been a Central Committee member for ten years, was now excluded from it.

Between November 1935 and April 1936, he undertook a lengthy visit to Paris where he worked with the so-called Lutetia Circle, attempting to create a "popular front" against the Hitler dictatorship. Most of exiled leaders of the German Communist Party had ended up in Paris, Moscow or (till 1937) Prague.  Communists, along with their Soviet backers, took the lead in the Lutetia project, while insisting that membership should be broadly based as was open to all who opposed Nazism in Germany. At least one preparatory meeting was convened at the Hôtel Lutetia in February and/or March 1936. Dengel presented a policy paper that had been helpfully drawn up by exiled members of the party politburo in Moscow.  There were nevertheless many on the political left who still blamed the German communists for splitting the political left during the early 1930s, thereby opening the way for the National Socialists to take power. Somehow, the energy the exiled communists devoted to the Lutetia Circle, served only to dampen the enthusiasm from other parts of the antifascist political spectrum.   The meeting at which Dengel gave his presentation left fellow delegates convinced that he was present simply as a "trusted representative" of the party leaders in Moscow and in April 1936 he was recalled to Moscow.   Attempts were made to revive the Lutetia Circle later during 1936, with the Communist Party leadership represented by Franz Dahlem and Walter Ulbricht.   The most visible outcome of the Lutetia Circle activities was the so-called "Appeal to the German people", signed by more than 70 German political exiles, Philipp Dengel among them, and issued at the end of December 1936. It called for the overthrow of the Hitler government and included the plea, "Create the German popular front!  For peace, liberty and bread!".

Later years 
Subsequently, during 1936, Dengel was recalled to party work, sent to Prague between April and September to facilitate and secure the production of the German-language "Deutsche Volkszeitung" (newspaper) being produced in the city at that time.   After returning to Moscow at the end of the year, he started work at the Comintern's International Lenin School as a teacher-instructor.    A few months after that news came through from Germany that on 8 March 1938 the government had deprived Dengel and his family of German citizenship rights.   At the "Bern" Party Congress (which took place in Draveil, on the edge of Paris a unanimous decision was taken to enlarge the Party Central Committee, and Dengel was re-elected to it. Whether on account of travel difficulties or on account of his deteriorating health, he was, along with at least three party comrades who were probably also based in Moscow at the time and had not made the journey to France, elected in his absence.   The conference itself had an unforeseen and disappointing epilogue. A few months after the exiled leaders of the German Communist Party passed resolutions committing to victory over fascism, comrades learned of the non-aggression pact between the Nazi and Communist dictatorships. Stalin and Hitler were suddenly on the same side. A few weeks later German forces and Soviet forces invaded Poland from opposite directions. In Moscow it was necessary to undergo a rapid change of heart when it came to "a united front against fascism".

There are reports that as early as 1929 Dengel was forced by serious illness to cut short a Comintern mission overseas.    There is no indication that he became more actively involved in party work after his return to the Central Committee ten years later. A further brutal diplomatic realignment emerged on 22 June 1941 as the German army launched a massive invasion of the Soviet Union in breach of the dictators' non-aggression pact. That same day, Philipp Dengel suffered a serious stroke from which he would never properly recover.   In 1944, he was listed as a member of the Soviet sponsored National Committee for a Free Germany, but he was no longer playing any active political role.   It was as an invalid that he returned with his wife to Berlin in September 1947. He died there six months later.

Notes

References 

1888 births
1948 deaths
People from Ingelheim am Rhein
German Army personnel of World War I
People of the German Revolution of 1918–1919
20th-century German journalists
Journalists from Hamburg
Members of the Reichstag of the Weimar Republic
Social Democratic Party of Germany politicians
Communist Party of Germany politicians
German Comintern people
Executive Committee of the Communist International